Brighton Bears was a British basketball team based in Brighton, Sussex. From 1984 to 1999 the club was known as the Worthing Bears and was based in the town of Worthing, 12 miles west of Brighton. The Bears played in the top-flight British Basketball League (BBL) until 2006 when the franchise folded. The final season was notable for the signing of former NBA star Dennis Rodman, who played three games for the Bears. The league's franchise for the Brighton-area, originally put on hold, was intended to be occupied by the Brighton Cougars from the 2008–09 season but the Cougars bid was rejected, with the league favouring rival candidate Worthing Thunder.

Franchise history
 1973 : The Brighton Bears are formed by Dave Goss. Initially the side consisted of a part-time squad of locals who played in the County League. They were coached by Peter Ray the English basketball team Coach.
 1977 : A few seasons later, and with a more talented squad assembled, the Bears took the step up to play in the National League Division Two for the 1977–78 season. The Bears signed their first overseas players during this period. Americans Kevin Kallaugher, Fritz Mayer, and Pete Durgerian were the first of a long line US college players to come to Brighton. The following four seasons saw a lot of hard work and a team which improved their performances year on year.
 1981–82 : Following a number of successful seasons playing in the Second Division, the Bears, playing some of their games in the Brighton Centre, started the 1981–1982 season in Division One for the first time. The season proved to be a tremendous learning curve. Playing against powerhouse teams such as Crystal Palace and Solent Stars proved too much for the Bears, and the team only managed 4 victories from 22 outings and ended the season at the bottom of the league. Americans Robin Farris and Jerry Jenkins were the stars of the team, with Jenkins leading the league in scoring.
 1982–83 : The following season saw the Bears battle their way up to 7th place in the league, claiming 13 victories. Under the guidance of Jimmie Guymon the team's success was built around a short team, equipped with speed. Players included Jerry Jenkins, seven-footer Nic Burns & Craig Evans.
 1983–84 : The appointment of Bill Sheridan as Head Coach saw a dramatic change in playing philosophy, with emphasis placed on the inside game and tall players. The playing roster was strengthened with the signing of, among others, Alan Cunningham. The team ended the season in 8th place with 17 wins.
The action on the court was however overshadowed by financial instability. High rents at the Brighton Centre combined with dwindling crowds meant that it was no longer financially viable for the team to operate out of Brighton, and the search for a new home began. The second half of the season saw home games being played in arenas all over the south, including Bognor, Eastleigh and Hastings.
 The Bears' first game at Worthing was against the Birmingham Bullets in December 1983. A crowd of 400 curious onlookers turned up to watch the game, and the passion and excitement generated made the directors choose Worthing as the new permanent home for the Bears. The rent of the Leisure Centre was agreed with Worthing Borough Council and fans decided to stick with the Bears name. The club began the 1984/85 season as the Worthing Bears.
 1984–85 : The Bears' first full season in Worthing proved to be their most successful under the guidance of coach Bill Sheridan. Most of the previous year's team returned, and they were bolstered by the signing of free-scoring guard Billy Hungrecker.
 After a slow start the team finished the season with a string of 7 victories that gave them fifth place in the league. They came up against Solent Stars in the play-offs, and despite losing the home leg live on Channel 4, won both away games to become the first team to ever make it to Wembley after losing the home tie. The team lost their semifinal though, with Colin Irish netting 41 points for eventual winners Manchester United.
 Although it was a successful season on court, financial problems continued to dog the club. Help was at hand in the form of a sponsorship package agreed with Nissan in November 1984. The team became known as Nissan Bears of Worthing and during the next 17 months the company pumped £110,000 into the club's coffers.
 1985–86 : For the third season running Bill Sheridan kept his squad relatively unchanged, although Alan Cunningham left and Dale Shackleford joined the club. Following defeat at the hands of Solent in the National Cup semifinal in January, club chairman Dave Goss resigned after 12 years at the helm. A new board of directors including Colin Smith took over, but more trouble loomed when Nissan announced they would not be continuing their sponsorship past the end of the season.
 In May 1986, having failed to find new sponsors for the club, operating director Colin Smith was forced to withdraw the club from the National League and close the business down. It seemed the Bears had played their last game.
 1986–87 : No Bears
 1987–88 : After 16 months without a club, the Worthing Bears fans were delighted when a new company was set up and the club was reborn in time to join the National League Division One for the start of the 1987/88 campaign.
Billy Hungrecker was appointed coach, and the new team exceeded all expectations as they won the league with a 100% (18–0) record. In a dramatic play-off semifinal Billy Hungrecker scored a record 73 points in a 119–110 overtime win over Plymouth, and the club went on to beat Brixton in the Wembley final to become Division One Play-off Champions.
 1988–89 : The 88/89 season was not so easy for the Bears, with clubs such as Brixton and Gateshead strengthening their squads. They finished the league in 4th place, and reached the play-off semi finals.
 1989–90 : For the first time since 1986 the Bears appointed a full-time coach in Dale Shackleford, who had temporarily retired before taking on a player-coach role. Two new Americans were signed; Gary Sparks and the soon to become legendary Herman Harried. The league itself was strengthened with the addition of three former premiership clubs.
 Herman Harried was worshipped by the fans and was surely one of the best ever Bears players. He top scored in 21 of his 26 games in the season, and recorded astonishing statistics of 31 points, 18 rebounds, 3 assists, 4.5 steals and 3 blocks per game, while shooting 69% from the floor.
 The season saw one of the most exciting games ever to be held at the Worthing Leisure Centre. The visitors were Crystal Palace, and the game was high-paced and nip and tuck all the way. Harried was the Bears saviour, scoring four points in the last five seconds to give his team a thrilling two-point win. The scenes of jubilation that ensued were to be matched only by those after the defeat of Thames Valley in 1993. The Bears finished second in the league with a 19–3 record, but fell in the first round of the play-offs to Crystal Palace and the recently traded Gary Sparks.
 1990–91 : Despite signing a new contract, Herman Harried left the club to join a Portuguese side in the off season. Dale Shackleford returned as coach, and added Bryan Heron and Ronnie Baker to the squad. This season marked the Bears' entry to the basketball Premiership after three successful seasons in Division One. Attendances were up to an average of 950 per game, and the Bears' seventh place in the league, a WICB semifinal, National Cup quarter final and a first round play-off berth were more than satisfactory rewards for the first year with the big boys. The Bears celebrated the end of the 1990–91 season with the Club of the Year award and seven consecutive sell-outs.
 1991–92 : Dale Shackleford entered his third year as player coach with a largely intact squad, including the likes of Bryan Heron, Ronnie Baker, Mark Scott, Mike Spaid and Gary Smith. The Bears had a very good season, finishing third in the league behind the clean-sweeping Kingston. Semifinals in the National Cup and the play-offs were also achieved, but the best was still to come…..
 1992–93 : The Bears squad was almost completely rebuilt over the summer of 1992, with new player-coach Alan Cunningham bringing in Colin Irish, Steve Nelson, Cleave Lewis and Kalpatrick Wells. The new team gelled quickly, and gave the Bears their first top-flight tournament win in the Carlsberg International Challenge.
 The Bears built on this early success to dominate the league, running out League Champions with a 31–2 record. This success could not be repeated in the club's first National Cup final, however, where they went down to Guildford Kings, but the Bears had the last laugh when they defeated arch rivals the Thames Valley Tigers 75–74 in a dramatic Wembley final to become Play-off Champions.
 This incredible season also included arguably the greatest game ever held in Worthing. The visitors were of course the Thames Valley Tigers, and before the match a capacity crowd saw the league championship trophy formally presented to Colin Irish. Early in the game it looked as if the 'pussy cats' would spoil the celebrations as they roared to an 11–1 and then a 19–9 lead, but an 18–9 burst from the champions saw the scores level at half-time. The teams traded the lead for most of the second period until the final dramatic minute:
 1 min – the Valley sneaked a six-point lead (73–79)
 55 secs – Mike Spaid hits an unlikely 3-pointer
 15 secs – Colin Irish shoots a trey, misses but is fouled. He sinks all three free-throws to tie the game
 6 secs – Tigers lose possession and then........
 2 secs – Cleave Lewis shoots the ball from just inside the halfway line, the ball hits the backboard and drops through the net for a famous 82–79 victory.
 1993–94 : The all-conquering Bears maintained much of their squad for the new season, the notable exception being Herman Harried returning to a hero's welcome to replace Kalpatrick Wells. The league was again dominated by the Bears and the Tigers, although it was the Bracknell team that pipped the Bears to the league title. Worthing certainly had their own successes though, with a 92–83 victory over the Tigers giving them their first National Cup win at the Sheffield Arena. The season was topped off with the Bears retaining their Wembley Championship title with a 71–65 victory over the Guildford Kings.
 1994–95 : Alan Cunningham retained his starting five for the new season, but the lack of depth on the bench combined with ageing limbs meant that the Bears struggled in the regular season, finishing only seventh in the league. When it came to the play-offs though it was a case of wisdom, guile and experience coming to the fore.
The Bears overcame the Tigers in a classic 3 leg quarter-final, and breezed past the league winning Sheffield Sharks to set up a final against the Manchester Giants. The Bears got off to a slow-start in the game, but in the end out-thought and out-fought the Giants to secure a 77–73 victory. The team had created basketball history by winning at Wembley for the third time in a row (the 'Three-Peat'); all the more amazing from a position of seventh seeds.
 The team had won 5 major championships in 3 seasons – still referred to as "the glory years". All good things come to an end though, and the team broke up in the off-season, with Irish taking over as player-coach and dispensing with the services of Harried and Lewis. Alan Cunningham, despite having just retired, was tempted back for 'one more year' by his old friend.
 1995–96 : Cunningham and Irish added US imports Derek Plair and Steve Paci to their line-up, and the team started encouragingly with a two-legged overtime loss to Portuguese outfit Uniao Desportica in the Korac Cup. The team had a mid-table season, but progressed well in the 7-Up Trophy, the only prize that the club had so far failed to pick up.
 After a nail-biting 2 legged victory over the Sharks in the semi, the Bears met the London Towers in the final, and blasted off to a 10-point half time lead. Playmaker Andrew Bailey had picked up an early injury though, and the Towers were able to pull back in the second half, eventually winning 90–84. The Towers went on to win the league while the Bears ended the season in seventh place, and for the first time in 5 years failed to make it to Wembley.
 Continuing cash problems meant the club was put up for sale, but eventually the town council came to the rescue with a £30,000 grant. In the off-season Irish and Cunningham left the club, and Cleave Lewis was installed as the new coach.
 1996–97 : Cleave Lewis and Neil McElduff were busy in the off-season, hiring players from far and wide. Some of them proved to be unsuccessful (South African David Uniacke, Spaniard Ernesto Moreno and Canadian Mark Craven all came and went), but others were anything but. Anthony Thomas was a solid and talented small forward, but it was the discovery of James Hamilton that was the highlight of an otherwise forgettable season.
 Hamilton led the league in rebounding (11.38rpg) and was the third highest scorer (24.09ppg), and it was largely down to him that the Bears were even able to win 12 league games in the season. They finished in 11th place, and failed to make the play-offs.
 The club's financial plight hit the headlines once again as the council pulled the plug on a provisionally agreed £25,000 handout after the club had put the franchise up for sale without informing councillors. In August 1997, just when it seemed the club was to go to the wall, American multi-millionaire Greg Fullerton flew in from Utah to buy the franchise. Fullerton and partner Bob Wood talked bullishly of taking the Bears back to the top and even discussed building a brand new arena.
 1997–98 : Fullerton and Wood assembled a squad from their own back yard, with Don Faux, Ryan Williams, Ben Caton, Ryan Cuff and coach Chris Jones all fresh out of the Utah college system.
 Steve Nelson and Gary Smith returned, and were joined by talented Canadian Shawn Swords. The season started brightly, but in November Fullerton sensationally quit the club without explanation.
 Bob Wood and new co-owner Christian Hamilton vowed to fight on, but the club's budget had been dramatically cut, and Caton, Cuff, Jones and Swords all followed Fullerton out of the door. The Bears hardly had enough players to field a team, and in the next few weeks went through their bleakest ever spell. A 113–40 loss to the Sheffield Sharks spoke volumes for the depth of the crisis. The squad was strengthened with the addition of Joel Burns, Greg Francis and Peter Knechtel, but the Bears continued to struggle, and went on a 19-game losing streak that was finally broken in an emotional Valentine's Day victory over Derby.
 The Bears finished bottom of the league, and faced losing their top-flight status. The owners convinced the league that they should be allowed to carry on.
 1998–99 : The new season saw a new-look Bears outfit, with American Chris Pullem taking over coaching duties. New signings included Jon Gaines and Larry Coates, and the team got off to a good start with some early victories. As ever though the next crisis was not far away, and after only 7 games Chris Pullem resigned after disagreements with owners Wood and Hamilton.
 Sean Loucks was drafted in to replace Pullem, but he was not able to keep the ship afloat, and the club lost 30 (yes, 30) straight games. The club finished rock-bottom of the league, with only 4 wins out of 36 starts. Late in the season Bob Wood sold his share of the club to Romek Kriwald, and as the season drew to a close the announcement was made that the Bears were to leave Worthing and head back to Brighton. The increased revenue and TV exposure that a venue such as the Brighton Centre could bring were seen as the only route back to success for the Bears.
 1999–2000 : The club's first year back in Brighton was a marked improvement on the previous years' decline. Home games were held at the Brighton Centre and the Burgess Hill Triangle, and attendances peaked at close to 3,000.
 As the Bears left Worthing to return to Brighton, a new club, Worthing Rebels (later Worthing Thunder), was formed to keep basketball in Worthing.
 During the season the Bears appointed Mark Dunning as their 7th coach in 3 years, and the club's ownership changed hands as well, with Romek Kriwald buying out Christian and Eileen Hamilton's interest to become sole owner of the franchise. On court, new signings including Jan Trojanowski and Michael Brown led the Bears to a respectable tally of 11 league wins, four short of a play-off berth. In the off-season Olympic gold medallist Tessa Sanderson acquired a stake in the Bears and became a director.
 2000–2001 : After the previous season's encouraging return to Brighton this was a disappointing year, with Mark Dunning's team falling well short of the play-offs. The highpoint of the season was the signing of Wilbur Johnson from the Sheffield Sharks, and he led the Bears from the front through an injury ravaged season. Other signings included Dave Wahl, Demetric Reese, Kevin Wallace and Errol Seaman. Off-court there was a further set-back as the Tessa Sanderson deal fell through. Mark Dunning was sacked at the end of the season.
 2001–2002 : Romek Kriwald pulled off a major coup in the pre-season by tempting ex-Towers play-caller Nick Nurse to join the club as Head Coach, general manager, Director and co-owner. Nurse immediately went about re-building the team, retaining only Michael Brown, Wilbur Johnson and Errol Seaman from the previous year's squad. New additions included captain Randy Duck, Albert White and Sterling Davis, and the team had a remarkable season with a 21–11 league record bringing the Bears within inches of winning the Southern Conference.
 The team reached the quarter-finals of the Trophy and the playoffs semifinals, the first time the Bears had enjoyed post-season action for 6 years. Highlights of the season included a memorable night at the Triangle in which the Bears ended the game with 18 unanswered points to beat the Lions by a point, and a heart-stopping tip-in by Rodger Farrington to take the Bears past the Eagles in the Playoff Quarter-final. White, Davis, Duck and Nurse all played in the All Star Game, with White and Davis also being named in the All League team.
 2002–2003 : Nick Nurse became sole owner of the Bears in the pre-season and quickly set about building a team to challenge for honours. The nucleus of the previous year's squad was retained, with Wilbur Johnson, Randy Duck, Michael Brown, Sterling Davis and Errol Seaman all returning. It was however the signing of All Stars Rico Alderson and Ralph Blalock that really caused a stir, with the Bears on paper at least looking a force to be reckoned with.
 The season certainly got off to a flying start, with the Bears winning their first 11 games to leap to the top of the league table. Three straight losses brought the team down to earth though, as they exited the Trophy at the first hurdle. Better progress was being made in the National Cup, with a narrow win over the London Towers setting up a showdown with the Chester Jets. Wilbur Johnson dominated the Final with a 24-point MVP performance, and an 89–79 victory gave the Bears their first piece of silverware since 1995. Eight years of hurt had finally been healed.
 The Bears' push for the League title suffered continued setbacks, however, as a series of injuries saw Duck, Blalock, Seaman and Emiko Etete all missing a series of games. Down the stretch the destiny of the league title was still in the Bears' hands, but home and away losses to the Sheffield Sharks saw the Yorkshire side pick up the title. In the Playoffs the Bears saw off the Towers and Eagles, but fell at the final hurdle, losing 76–83 to the Scottish Rocks in the BBL Championship Final.
 Wilbur Johnson and Sterling Davis were both named on the BBL All League Team.
 2003–2004 : For only the second time in the club's history the Bears raised their ambitions to the European level this season, entering the ULEB Cup. Nick Nurse had to rebuild his team to meet the differing Import restrictions, retaining only Randy Duck, Mike Brown and Rico Alderson from the previous year's squad. Joining them were Kendrick Warren, Andrew Alleyne, Jason Siemon, Sullivan Phillips, Yorick Williams and Tom Frederick. The new Bears line-up was arguably the deepest the club has ever seen.
 The Bears' early ULEB Cup games contained some remarkable encounters, including an overtime defeat to Split Croatia and a two-point defeat to Lietuvos Rytas in front of 800 boisterous Lithuanians at the Brighton Centre. Despite running most teams close the Bears had a 0–5 record, but astonishingly won four of their last five games to just miss out on a second round berth. The Bears pulled off incredible victories against European giants Split and Rytas on their own courts, and wrapped up the adventure with an exhilarating double-overtime victory over Cholet, led by 49 points from Randy Duck.
 On the domestic front the Bears were neck and neck with the Sheffield Sharks in the league title chase, and stepped up the pressure during a 15-game unbeaten run against British opponents that lasted for well over 3 months. As the Sharks faltered towards the end of the season the Bears went from strength to strength, securing the BBL League title for the first time in eleven years with victory over the Leicester Riders.
 The Bears fared less well in the knock-out competitions, falling to the Chester Jets in both the Trophy final and the Playoff semi.
 Nick Nurse was named BBL Coach of the Year, with Kendrick Warren being voted on to the BBL All League Team.
 2004–2005 : It was a new-look Bears team that took to the court this season, with only Yorick Williams and Andrew Alleyne returning from the previous years' title winning squad. Among those joining them in the blue and white were Ryan Huntley, Ajou Deng and Tony Holley, with Ronnie Baker making a welcome mid-season return to the south coast after a 12-year absence.
 The season started on a low note with the Bears having to withdraw from European competition at the last minute, but there was much better news on the domestic front with Nick Nurse's men winning 16 of their first 20 league games to go to the top of the table. This spell of games also saw the team reach the final of the Trophy after a nail-biting 87–84 victory over the London Towers, and climaxed in the Bears winning the BBL Cup for the second time in three seasons, following a 90–74 defeat of the Scottish Rocks at the National Indoor Arena.
 The season had started so well that a "clean sweep" of all four domestic honours was being discussed in hushed tones amongst the Bears faithful. Unfortunately, disaster was about to strike, with both Yorick Williams and Ryan Huntley picking up season ending injuries. The early season form was turned on its head, with the Bears easily beaten by the Newcastle Eagles in the Trophy final at the Brighton Centre, and then losing 14 of their remaining 20 games to slump to a fifth-place finish in the league. The season ended with a 91–56 playoff quarter final thumping from the Sharks.
 2005–2006 : The off-season saw another wholesale change in the Bears locker-room, with only Alleyne and Baker returning. They were joined by Terrance McGee and previous league MVP Jerry Williams, but the team struggled, never managing to put a run of wins together. The Bears finished eighth in the league with a 17–23 record, and failed to progress beyond the first stages of the Trophy, Cup or Playoffs.
 The highlight of the year was undoubtedly the signing of NBA legend Dennis Rodman for three games. Rodman had recently appeared in the Celebrity Big Brother TV show in the UK, and his appearances for the Bears drew packed houses and arguably the largest media presence ever seen at a British basketball game. Rodman's appearances were certainly welcomed by the Bears fans, but they also caused controversy when it transpired that the Bears had broken player eligibility rules by playing Rodman alongside the three permitted work-permit players.
 In the summer of 2006 the Bears announced that they would be taking a year off from the BBL "in the interests of the long term viability of the franchise". Owner Nick Nurse was reported to be looking into options for moving the Bears into an NBA Development League or the proposed rival British Basketball Association (BBA), but neither option came to fruition. Nurse moved back to the States, and with no fellow Directors to take over the reins the once glorious Bears were no more.

Season-by-season records

Notes:

From 1999–2002, the BBL operated a Conference system. Brighton competed in the Southern Conference.
DNQ denotes Did Not Qualify.

Trophies

League
 NBL Division One Winners: 1987/88 1
 BBL Championship Winners: 1992/93, & 2003/04 2
 BBL Championship Runners Up: 1993/94, & 2002/03 2
 BBL Southern Conference Runners Up: 2001/02, & 2002/03 2

Playoffs
 NBL Division One Play Off Winners: 1987/88 1
 BBL Championship Play Off Winners: 1992/93, 1993/94, & 1994/95 3
 BBL Championship Play Off Runners Up: 2002/03 1

Trophy
 BBL Trophy Runners Up: 1995/96, 2002/03 & 2003/04 3

Cup
 National Cup Winners: 1993/94, & 2002/03 2
 National Cup Runners Up: 1992/93 1
 BBL Cup Winners: 2004/05 1

External links
Official website
Previous incarnation of official website (frozen as at summer 2002)
Tom Oliver's Brighton Bears photo galleries
Official Brighton Cougars website

Basketball teams established in 1973
Basketball teams disestablished in 2006
Defunct basketball teams in the United Kingdom
Sport in Brighton and Hove
1973 establishments in England
2006 disestablishments in England
Sport in Worthing
Former British Basketball League teams